Gunnar Wærness (born 22 November 1971) is a Norwegian poet. He made his literary début in 1999 with the poetry collection Kongesplint, for which he was awarded the Tarjei Vesaas' debutantpris. Among his other poetry collections are Takk from 2002 and Hverandres from 2006.

Selected works 
 (poetry collection)
 (poetry collection)
 (poetry collection) 
 (poetry collection)
 (poetry anthology, jointly with co-editor Pedro Carmona-Alvarez)
Tungen og tåren. 2013. (poetry collection)
 (poetry collection)
Å skrive er å be om for mye. 2020. 
Ta på Jesus/Touch Jesus. 2021.

References

External links
 Personal homepage 

1971 births
People from Trondheim
20th-century Norwegian poets
Norwegian male poets
Living people
21st-century Norwegian poets
Place of birth missing (living people)
20th-century Norwegian male writers
21st-century Norwegian male writers